H. R. Gokhale  (5 October 1915 – 15 February 1978) was an Indian politician who was a member of the Indian National Congress from Maharashtra and of the Lok Sabha from Mumbai North West. He served as cabinet minister of Law and Justice in the Indira Gandhi government during The Emergency (1975–1977). He died at the age of 62 after suffering a heart attack in New Delhi in February 1978.

He was the father in law of the writer Namita Gokhale.

References

1915 births
1978 deaths
India MPs 1971–1977
Lok Sabha members from Maharashtra
Marathi politicians
People of the Emergency (India)
Politicians from Mumbai
Indian National Congress politicians
Law_Ministers of India
Petroleum and Natural Gas Ministers of India
Members of the Cabinet of India
Indian National Congress politicians from Maharashtra